Feedback linearization is a common strategy employed in nonlinear control to control nonlinear systems. Feedback linearization techniques may be applied to nonlinear control systems of the form

where  is the state,  are the inputs. The approach involves transforming a nonlinear control system into an equivalent linear control system through a change of variables and a suitable control input.

An outer-loop control strategy for the resulting linear control system can then be applied to achieve the control objective.

Feedback Linearization of SISO Systems 

Here, consider the case of feedback linearization of a single-input single-output (SISO) system. Similar results can be extended to multiple-input multiple-output (MIMO) systems. The objective is to find a coordinate transformation  that transforms the system (1) into the so-called normal form which will reveal a feedback law of the form

that will render a linear input–output map from the new input  to the output . To ensure that the transformed system is an equivalent representation of the original system, the transformation must be a diffeomorphism. That is, the transformation must not only be invertible (i.e., bijective), but both the transformation and its inverse must be smooth so that differentiability in the original coordinate system is preserved in the new coordinate system. In practice, the transformation can be only locally diffeomorphic and the linearization results only hold in this smaller region.

Several tools are required to solve this problem.

Lie derivative 

The goal of feedback linearization is to produce a transformed system whose states are the output  and its first  derivatives. To understand the structure of this target system, we use the Lie derivative. Consider the time derivative of (2), which can be computed using the chain rule,

Now we can define the Lie derivative of  along  as,

and similarly, the Lie derivative of  along  as,

With this new notation, we may express  as,

Note that the notation of Lie derivatives is convenient when we take multiple derivatives with respect to either the same vector field, or a different one. For example,

and

Relative degree 

In our feedback linearized system made up of a state vector of the output  and its first  derivatives, we must understand how the input  enters the system. To do this, we introduce the notion of relative degree. Our system given by (1) and (2) is said to have relative degree  at a point  if,

Considering this definition of relative degree in light of the expression of the time derivative of the output , we can consider the relative degree of our system (1) and (2) to be the number of times we have to differentiate the output  before the input  appears explicitly. In an LTI system, the relative degree is the difference between the degree of the transfer function's denominator polynomial (i.e., number of poles) and the degree of its numerator polynomial (i.e., number of zeros).

Linearization by feedback 

In this case, after differentiating the output  times we have,

That is, the input  has no direct contribution to any of the first th derivatives.

The coordinate transformation  that puts the system into normal form comes from the first  derivatives. In particular,

transforms trajectories from the original  coordinate system into the new  coordinate system. So long as this transformation is a diffeomorphism, smooth trajectories in the original coordinate system will have unique counterparts in the  coordinate system that are also smooth. Those  trajectories will be described by the new system,

Hence, the feedback control law

The resulting linearized system

is a cascade of  integrators, and an outer-loop control  may be chosen using standard linear system methodology. In particular, a state-feedback control law of

where the state vector  is the output  and its first  derivatives, results in the LTI system

with,

Unstable zero dynamics 

However, the normal form of the system will include zero dynamics (i.e., states that are not observable from the output of the system) that may be unstable. In practice, unstable dynamics may have deleterious effects on the system (e.g., it may be dangerous for internal states of the system to grow unbounded). These unobservable states may be controllable or at least stable, and so measures can be taken to ensure these states do not cause problems in practice. Minimum phase systems provide some insight on zero dynamics.

See also 
 Nonlinear control

Further reading 

 A. Isidori, Nonlinear Control Systems, third edition, Springer Verlag, London, 1995.
 H. K. Khalil, Nonlinear Systems, third edition, Prentice Hall, Upper Saddle River, New Jersey, 2002.
 M. Vidyasagar, Nonlinear Systems Analysis, second edition, Prentice Hall, Englewood Cliffs, New Jersey, 1993.
 B. Friedland, Advanced Control System Design, facsimile edition, Prentice Hall, Upper Saddle river, New Jersey, 1996.

External links 
 
 ECE 758: Modeling and Nonlinear Control of a Single-link Flexible Joint Manipulator – Gives explanation and an application of feedback linearization.
 ECE 758: Ball-in-Tube Linearization Example – Trivial application of linearization for a system already in normal form (i.e., no coordinate transformation necessary).
 Wolfram language functions to do feedback linearization, compute relative orders, and determine zero dynamics.

Nonlinear control